The Sheffield Software Engineering Observatory (Observatory) was founded in 2005 by an EPSRC grant at the University of Sheffield. The Observatory is a multi-disciplinary collaboration between the Department of Computer Science and the Institute of Work Psychology at the University of Sheffield.

Overview 

Its aim is to understand the processes that makes for good software engineering practice, and how are these needs to combine human and technical factors.

The Software Engineering Observatory is an empirical software engineering research facility where researchers can use a variety of methodologies to study software developers working on real industrial projects. The software developers are students, both undergraduate and postgraduate and up to 20 group projects were undertaken each year. Thus, researchers can investigate how software developers work in teams, deal with industrial clients and handle the plethora of problems that arise in group projects with tight time-scales.
A key feature is that the Observatory allows multiple teams to work on identical projects concurrently in competition with each other, which allows comparisons to be made of different software development processes.
The Observatory enables researchers to gather data that are relevant to many of the key issues in contemporary software engineering, which will be of interest to both academics and practitioners. The implications of the results so far are that effective software managers must not just understand the technical aspects of the work that their staff are doing, but must also understand their staff as individuals and how they can best work together in teams.

Research areas

The Observatory’s research agenda includes:
	Assessing, through controlled experiments, the relative merits of software development methods and methodologies in terms of both the quality of output and the well-being of the developers.
	Devising empirically-based models of the processes that developers are observed to use
	Identifying the factors that make for good team-based software development, including leadership, the personality, skill, gender and ethnic mix of teams, and how task conflict can contribute, constructively, to enhanced performance.
	Investigating the relative importance of (a) the methodology adopted by the team and degree of fidelity to it, (b) the individual’s participant’s motivation and knowledge, and (c) team processes in accounting for variability in the performance of the group.

The data from these experiments will be made available to bona-fide researchers in empirical software engineering.

History

The Observatory was founded in 2005, however prior to that a number of PhD students designed experiments and collected data on the software engineering process. These were all based on the pioneering taught courses devised at the University of Sheffield

References

External links 
 Software Observatory homepage
 epiGenesys - a University of Sheffield company

University of Sheffield
Software engineering organizations